Vincenzo Tanara or Tanari (died 1667) was an Italian agronomist and gastronome.

A Bolognese nobleman, he wrote the important 1653 treatise entitled L'economia del cittadino in villa (The economy of the citizen in the country).

Career 
Tanara had established a close friendship with the cardinal Francesco Sforza who had a large library in Bologna. This gave him access to books. He wrote a manuscript on bird hunting, that remained unpublished until the 19th century: La caccia degli uccelli.

In his major work, Tanara wrote of plants in order to provide a guide for "city dwellers." In Botanical Progress, Horticultural Innovation and Cultural Changes, it written that Tanara's "handbooks became very popular among land stewards as landowners were losing their interest in direct management of their estates." Not only did he characterize plant life as central to family economy: he specialized in "utility," particularly agricultural efficiency.

References

W. John, Kress, Mauro Ambrosoli, Nurhan Atasoy, and Peter Del Tredici. Botanical Progress, Horticultural Innovation and Cultural Changes. Ed. Michael Conan. Vol. 28. N.p.: Dumbarton Oaks Research Library and Collection, 2007. Print.

External links
 Polybiblio

1667 deaths
Writers from Bologna
Italian male writers
Italian agronomists
Italian food writers
Year of birth unknown
17th-century agronomists
Italian gastronomes